The Modoc are an Indigenous American people who historically lived in the area which is now northeastern California and central Southern Oregon. Currently, they include two federally recognized tribes, the Klamath Tribes in Oregon and the Modoc Tribe of Oklahoma, now known as the Modoc Nation.

Language
The Modoc, like the neighboring Klamath, spoke dialectic varieties of the Klamathan/Lutuamian language, a branch of the Plateau Penutian language family.  Both peoples called themselves maklaks, meaning "people".  To distinguish between the tribes, the Modoc called themselves Moatokni maklaks, from muat meaning "South".  The Achomawi, a band of the Pit River tribe, called them Lutuami, meaning "Lake Dwellers".

Current population and geography

About 600 Modoc live in Klamath County, Oregon, in and around their ancestral homelands. This group includes those who stayed on the reservation during the Modoc War, as well as the descendants of those who chose to return in 1909 to Oregon from Indian Territory in Oklahoma or Kansas. Since that time, many have followed the path of the Klamath. The shared tribal government of the Klamath, Modoc and Yahooskin in Oregon is known as the Klamath Tribes.

Two hundred Modoc live in Oklahoma on a small reservation in Ottawa County, Oklahoma, that the federal government purchased for them. Originally they were placed on the Quapaw Indian Reservation in Oklahoma's far northeast corner. They are descendants of the band Captain Jack (Kintpuash) led during the Modoc War. The federal government officially recognized the Modoc Tribe of Oklahoma in 1978, and its constitution was approved in 1991.

Early population

Estimates for the pre-contact populations of most native groups in California have varied substantially. James Mooney put the aboriginal population of the Modoc at 400. Alfred L. Kroeber estimated the Modoc population within California as 500 at the year 1770. University of Oregon anthropologist Theodore Stern suggested that there had been a total of about 500 Modoc. In 1846, the  population may have included "perhaps 600 warriors (an overestimate, probably)".

History

Pre-contact
Until the 19th century, when European explorers first encountered the Modoc, like all Plateau Indians, they caught salmon during salmon runs and migrated seasonally to hunt and gather other food. In winter, they built earthen dugout lodges shaped like beehives, covered with sticks and plastered with mud, near lake shores with reliable sources of seeds from aquatic wokas plants and fishing.

Neighboring groups
In addition to the Klamath, with whom they shared a language and the Modoc Plateau, the groups neighboring the Modoc home were:
Shasta on the Klamath River;
Rogue River Athabaskans and Takelma west over the Cascade Mountains;
Northern Paiute east in the desert;
Karuk and Yurok further down the Klamath River; and
Achomawi or Pit River to the south, in the meadows of the Pit River drainages.

The Modoc, Northern Paiute, and Achomawi shared Goose Lake Valley.

Settlements
The known Modoc village sites are Agawesh, where Willow Creek enters Lower Klamath Lake, of the Gombatwa·s or Lower Klamath Lake People Band; Kumbat and Pashha on the shores of Tule Lake of the Pasganwa·s or Tule Lake People Band; and Wachamshwash and Nushalt-Hagak-ni on the Lost River of the Goġewa·s or Lower Lost River People Band. The Modoc have also been known as the Modok (Brandt and Davis-Kimball xvi).

First contact
In the 1820s, Peter Skene Ogden, an explorer for the Hudson's Bay Company, established trade with the Klamath people north of the Modoc.

Applegate Trail established
Brothers Jesse and Lindsay Applegate, accompanied by 13 other white settlers, established the Applegate Trail, or South Emigrant Trail, in 1846. It connected a point on the Oregon Trail near Fort Hall, Idaho, and the Willamette Valley in western Oregon. The new route was created to encourage European-Americans to come to western Oregon, and to eliminate the hazards encountered on the Columbia Route. Since the Hudson's Bay Company controlled the Columbia Route, development of an alternate route enabled migration even if there were trouble between the United States and the United Kingdom. The Applegate brothers became the first known white people in present-day Lava Beds National Monument.

The opening of the Applegate Trail appeared to bring the first regular contact between the Modoc and the European-American settlers, who had largely ignored their territory before. Many of the events of the Modoc War took place along the trail.

Emigrant invasion
From 1846 to 1873, thousands of emigrants entered the Modoc territory. Beginning in 1847, the Modoc raided the invading emigrants on the Applegate Trail under the leadership of Old Chief Schonchin.

In September 1852, the Modoc destroyed an emigrant train at Bloody Point on the east shore of Tule Lake, killing all but three of the 65 people in the party. The Modoc took two young girls as captives. One or both of them may have been killed several years later by jealous Modoc women. The only man to survive the attack made his way to Yreka, California. After hearing his news, Yreka settlers organized a militia under Sheriff Charles McDermit, Jim Crosby, and Ben Wright.  They went to the scene of the massacre to bury the dead and avenge their deaths. Crosby's party had a skirmish with a band of Modoc and returned to Yreka.

Wright and a small group stayed on to avenge the deaths. He was a notorious Indian hater. Accounts differ as to what took place when Wright's party met the Modoc on the Lost River, but most agree that Wright planned to ambush them, which he did in November 1852. Wright and his forces attacked, killing approximately 40 Modoc, in what came to be known as the "Ben Wright Massacre."

Treaty with the United States

The United States, the Klamath, the Modoc, and the Yahooskin band of Snake tribes signed a treaty in 1864 that established the Klamath Reservation. It required the tribes to cede the land bounded on the north by the 44th parallel, on the west and south by the ridges of the Cascade Mountains, and on the east by lines touching Goose Lake and Henley Lake back up to the 44th parallel.

In return, the United States was to make a lump sum payment of $35,000, and annual payments totaling $80,000 over 15 years, as well as provide infrastructure and staff for a reservation. The treaty provided that if the Indians drank or stored intoxicating liquor on the reservation, the payments could be withheld and that the United States could locate additional tribes on the reservation in the future. 

The treaty required that the Modoc surrender their lands near Lost River, Tule Lake, and Lower Klamath Lake in exchange for lands in the Upper Klamath Valley. They did so, under the leadership of Chief Schonchin. The Indian agent estimated the total population of the three tribes at about 2,000 when the treaty was signed.

The land of the reservation did not provide enough food for both the Klamath and the Modoc peoples. Illness and tension between the tribes increased. The Modoc requested a separate reservation closer to their ancestral home, but neither the federal nor the California government approved it.

In 1870 Kintpuash (also called Captain Jack) led a band of Modoc to leave the reservation and return to their traditional homelands. They built a village near the Lost River. These Modoc had not been adequately represented in the treaty negotiations and wished to end the harassment by the Klamath on the reservation.

Modoc War

In November 1872, the U.S. Army was sent to Lost River to attempt to force Kintpuash's band back to the reservation. A battle broke out, and the Modoc escaped to what is called Captain Jack's Stronghold in what is now Lava Beds National Monument, California. The band of fewer than 53 warriors was able to hold off the 3,000 U.S. Army troops for several months, defeating them in combat several times. In April 1873, the Modoc left the Stronghold and began to splinter. Kintpuash and his group were the last to be captured, on June 4, 1873, when they voluntarily gave themselves up. U.S. government personnel had assured them that their people would be treated fairly and the warriors would be allowed to live on their own land.

The U.S. Army tried, convicted and executed Kintpuash and three of his warriors in October 1873 for the murder of Major General Edward Canby earlier that year at a parley. Canby had violated agreements made with the Modoc. The Army sent the rest of the band to Oklahoma as prisoners of war with Scarfaced Charley as their chief. The tribe's spiritual leader, Curley Headed Doctor, was also forced to remove to Indian Territory.

In the 1870s, Peter Cooper brought Indians to speak to Indian rights groups in eastern cities. One of the delegations was from the Modoc and Klamath tribes. In 1909, the group in Oklahoma was given permission to return to Oregon. Several people did, but most stayed at their new home.

Culture
The religion of the Modoc is not known in detail.  The number five figured heavily in ritual, as in the Shuyuhalsh, a five-night dance rite of passage for adolescent girls.  A sweat lodge was used for purification and mourning ceremonies.

Namesakes
Modoc Plateau, Modoc National Forest, Modoc County, California; Modoc, Indiana; and numerous other places are named after this group of people.

See also
 Modoc traditional narratives
 Indigenous peoples of California

Further reading

Notes

References

External links

Modoc Tribe of Oklahoma, official website
Klamath Tribes: Klamath, Modoc, Yahooskin, official website
Southern Oregon Digital Archives

 
 
Native American tribes in California
Native American tribes in Oregon
Native American tribes in Oklahoma
Modoc Plateau
History of the Great Basin
History of Modoc County, California
Native American history of California